The Chinese Ambassador to Peru is the official representative of the People's Republic of China to the Republic of Peru.

List of representatives

See also
List of ambassadors of Peru to China

See also
China–Peru relations
Embassy of China, Lima

References 

 
China
Peru